Hocus Focus may refer to:

 "Hocus Focus", the twenty-fourth episode of season four of the American sitcom series Will & Grace
 Hocus Focus Films, an Israeli film studio
 Hocus-Focus, a comics page feature begun by Harold Kaufmann and continued by Henry Boltinoff

See also
 Hocus Pocus (disambiguation)